Red Bank is an unincorporated community in Tehama County, in the U.S. state of California.

History
A variant name was "Redbank". A post office called Redbank was established in 1904, and remained in operation until 1918. The community takes its name from nearby Red Bank Creek.

References

Unincorporated communities in Tehama County, California